Physarales is an order of Amoebozoa in the class Myxomycetes. It contains three families, the Didymiaceae, the Lamprodermataceae, and the Physaraceae. Physarales was circumscribed by Thomas Huston Macbride and published in 1922.

References

Myxogastria
Amoebozoa orders